is a Japanese photographer and contemporary artist professionally known by the mononym . Known primarily for photography that blends eroticism and bondage in a fine art context, he has published over 500 books.

Early life and education
Araki was born in Tokyo on May 25, 1940. He studied film and photography at Chiba University from 1959, receiving a degree in 1963.  He worked at the advertising agency Dentsu, where, in 1968, he met his future wife, the essayist .

Art career
Araki is one of the most prolific Japanese artists. Many of his photographs are erotic, straddling a line between art and pornography. Among his photography books are Sentimental Journey (1971), and Tokyo Lucky Hole (1990). Sentimental Journey "1972–1992" is a diary of life with his wife Yōko, who died of ovarian cancer in 1990. The first part of Sentimental Journey shows the couple embarking on married life—their honeymoon and sexual relations. Pictures taken during Yoko's last days were published in Winter Journey.

Araki contributed photography to the Sunrise anime series Brain Powerd.

In 1981, Araki directed , a roman porno film, for the studio Nikkatsu. The film was a disappointment to Araki's fans and to fans of the pink film genre.

The Icelandic musician Björk is an admirer of Araki's work, and served as one of his models. At her request, he photographed the cover and inner sleeve pages of her 1997 remix albumTelegram. More recently, he has photographed pop singer Lady Gaga.

In 2004, an American director, Travis Klose, released a documentary about Araki called Arakimentari, which discusses the artist's lifestyle and work.

Araki was diagnosed with prostate cancer in 2008; he underwent successful surgery to remove the tumor.

In 2010, Araki's cat, Chiro, died of old age.

In October 2013, Araki lost vision in his right eye due to a retinal artery obstruction. The 74-year-old artist used the experience as an inspiration to exhibit Love on the left eye, held on 21 June 2014 at Taka Ishii Gallery, Tokyo.

Commissioned by Italian luxury label Bottega Veneta, Araki photographed Saskia de Brauw and Sung Jin Park in Tokyo for the brand's spring/summer 2015 campaign.

Controversy
Araki is known for his intimate access to models. When asked about this in 2011, he bragged that he gained access through sex.

In April 2018, Kaori, a model who posed for Araki from 2001 to 2016, wrote a blog post about her relationship with Araki in which she accused him of financial and artistic exploitation. Kaori stated that "she worked without a contract, was forced to take part in explicit shoots in front of strangers, was not regularly paid and that her nude images were often used without her consent." In 2017, when she requested that he stop republishing or exhibiting some photographs of her, Araki wrote to Kaori, warning that she had no rights. She states that the experience led to psychological trauma and ill health. Kaori stated that the Me Too movement had encouraged her to speak out. The accusations have raised questions about the power dynamics between a photographer and his subject. In order to raise awareness of Kaori's claims, the activist group Angry Asian Girls Association protested the opening of an exhibition of photographs by Araki at C/O Berlin December 2018.

Awards
1964: Taiyō Prize for photo reportage, Japan. 
1964: Sun Prize, Japan.
1990: Shashin-no-kai Prize from the Photographic Society of Japan
1991: 7th Higashikawa Prize.
1994: Japan Inter-Design Forum Grand Prix.
2008: Austrian Decoration for Science and Art.
2012: Top Prize at the 6th ANGO Awards.
2012: 54th Mainichi Art Award.

Publications by Araki (selected)
Zerokkusu Shashincho 1–25 = Xeroxed Photo Album 1–25. A series of books self-produced using a photocopier, published from 1970 onwards, each in an edition of 70 copies.
Senchimentaru na Tabi. = Sentimental Journey.
Senchimentaru na Tabi. Tokyo: self-published, 1971. Title and text in Japanese. 100 black and white photographs.
Sentimental Journy. Tokyo: Kawade Shobo Shinsha, 2016. . Facsimile edition. With an introduction in Japanese and English by Araki. Housed in a slipcase with a postcard.
Tokyo Lucky Hole.
Tokyo Lucky Hole 1983–1985 Shinjuku Kabuki-cho district. Tokyo: Ohta Shuppan, 1990. 272 pages. 
Tokyo Lucky Hole. Cologne: Taschen. With texts by Akira Suei and Akihito Yasumi translated into English, French and German. 704 pages. 1997, ; 2005, ; 2015, .
Shokuji = The Banquet. Tokyo: Magazine House, 1993. 32 black and white and 28 colour photographs. With a text by Araki.
Self, Life, Death. New York: Phaidon, 2005. Edited by Akiko Miki. .
Photography for the Afterlife. Tokyo: Heibonsha, 2014. . With an essay by Mario Perniola, "Araki's Hell".
Tokyo. Munich: Pinakothek der Moderne; Only Photography, 2017. 28 diptychs. With essays. Edition of 300 copies.
  A 560-page retrospective survey of Araki's body of work selected by the artist.

Films

Films by Araki
 (1981)
 (1994)
Flower Rondo 3 (2002) – documentary short
Flower Rondo 4: Kakyoku (2003) – documentary short
Painting Flowers in the Sky Over the Balcony (2004) – documentary
Fuyuharu (2004) – documentary short

Films about Araki
A Live DVD Araki Overseas 1997 – 2000 (2002) – documentary
Arakimentari (2004) – documentary directed by Travis Klose

Films based on Araki's life 

 Tokyo Biyori (1997) – a biographical drama based on the life of Yoko Araki, the wife of Nobuyoshi Araki. Written by Nobuyoshi Araki and Ryo Iwamatsu, and directed by Naoto Takenaka. The Araki couple were portrayed by Naoto Takenaka and Miho Nakayama. Araki makes a cameo as a train conductor.

Exhibitions
 2005: Araki, Anton Kern Gallery, New York City.
 2006: Implosion (Ten Year Anniversary), Anton Kern Gallery, New York City.
 2008: Friends and Family, Anton Kern Gallery, New York City.
 2009: Araki, Anton Kern Gallery, New York City.
2010: Exposed: Voyeurism, Surveillance, and the Camera Since 1870, San Francisco Museum of Modern Art, San Francisco
 2015: The Pistils Waltz, Gallery 51, Antwerp.
 2018: The Incomplete Araki, Museum of Sex, New York City
 2018: Nobuyoshi Araki: KATA-ME, Rat Hole Gallery
 2018: Nobuyoshi Araki: Monstrous Paradise, RuArts Gallery, Moscow
 2022: Nobuyoshi Araki: Hanaguruma, Hamiltons Gallery, London

Collections
Araki's work is held in the following permanent public collections:
Israel Museum, Jerusalem
Tate, London
San Francisco Museum of Modern Art, San Francisco, CA
 Museum of Contemporary Art, Chicago
 Art Institute of Chicago
 The National Science and Media Museum, Bradford, UK
 The Stedelijk Museum, Amsterdam
 Museum für Moderne Kunst, Frankfurt
 Goetz Collection, Munich, Germany

Notes

References

External links

  
"Nobuyoshi Araki: Intimate photography: Tokyo, nostalgia and sex" by C. B. Liddell at The Japan Times (23 November 2006)

1940 births
BDSM photographers
Chiba University alumni
Japanese contemporary artists
Japanese erotic photographers
Japanese photographers
Living people
Nude photography
People from Tokyo
Recipients of the Austrian Decoration for Science and Art
Street photographers